Amantis gestri is a species of praying mantis native to the Philippines.

References

gestri
Mantodea of Southeast Asia
Insects of the Philippines
Insects described in 1915